Juan Bautista Plaza Alfonso (Caracas, Venezuela June 19, 1898 – 1965) was a classical composer.  He began studies in medicine at the Central University of Venezuela but, with time, left in order to dedicate himself to music.  His first teacher was Jesus Maria Suárez.  He studied in Rome from 1920 and 1923 and obtained the title of professor of sagrada (sacred) composition.  After his return to Venezuela he was named Master of Chapel at Caracas Cathedral and carried out this position until the year 1948.  In the Caracas Superior Music School he taught music history and appreciation to composer Antonio Lauro and singer Morella Muñoz.

Legacy
He also wrote notable religious music (e.g., Misa en fa) and music for the piano (e.g., Sonatina venezolana, Cuatro ritmos de danza). His popular song El Curruchá is a well-known example of joropo. Plaza's pupils include Alba Quintanilla.

The National Library of Venezuela, has a room named after him.

See also
Venezuela 
Venezuelan music

References 

Juan Bautista Plaza - Venezuelatuya.com

1898 births
1965 deaths
Venezuelan classical musicians
Venezuelan composers
Male composers
People from Caracas
Central University of Venezuela alumni
20th-century composers
20th-century male musicians